Meriem Mebarki (born 22 June 2003) is an Algerian fencer. She competed in the women's foil event at the 2020 Summer Olympics. She finished in 33rd place, after losing to Flóra Pásztor of Hungary in the Round of 64.

References

External links
 

2003 births
Living people
Algerian female foil fencers
Olympic fencers of Algeria
Fencers at the 2020 Summer Olympics
Place of birth missing (living people)
21st-century Algerian women
Mediterranean Games competitors for Algeria
Competitors at the 2022 Mediterranean Games